Iain Paul (1939–2012) was a Scottish chemist and theologian born in Glasgow, Scotland as the second world war was stirring.   Iain and his sister were raised by their paternal grandparents attending Govan High School (1951–1957).

Academic life
Paul studied Chemistry at the University of Strathclyde, Glasgow.  Following this he undertook a doctorate in Chemistry which he started at Bangor University and completed at the University of Bristol under the supervision of Professor F. Gordon A. Stone.  Following a spell as a post doctoral researcher, at the University of Sheffield under the supervision of Professor Sidney Kettle, he took up a position at Queen Elizabeth College, London as a lecturer in chemistry.  His years as a Chemist were highly productive leading to numerous publications in the field of vibrational spectroscopy of isolated molecules, group theory and crystal chemistry.  Over time he developed an increasing interest in solid-state physics.

In the 1970s, Iain retrained as a  theologian and clergyman at New College, Edinburgh.  He spent a year of his early career in the ministry at Princeton University researching a PhD in theology under the supervision of Professor Thomas F. Torrance.  As a systematic theologian, his work focused on the relationship between Science and Religion and he published several books in this field.

During this time he married Liz (Russell) and had a son, Findlay Paul and a daughter Liza Paul (now Dr Liza Morton).  He retired, due to ill health, from the Church of Scotland (Craigneuk, Wishaw) in 1990.

Works

Books

Science and Religion: One World-Changing Perspectives on Reality, edited by Jan Fennema and Iain Paul, Publisher: Dordrecht ; Kluwer Academic Publishers, c1990, 
Knowledge of God, Calvin, Einstein, and Polanyi, Edinburgh: Scottish Academic Press, 1987, 
Science and Theology in Einstein's Perspective, Edinburgh: Scottish Academic Press, 1986, 
Science, Theology and Einstein, New York: Oxford University Press, 1982,  (Original Publication @ Belfast: Christian Journals, c1982)

Selected peer-reviewed publications

Reviews

External links
 Comparison of Paul's thesis on Polanyi
 Obituary, Govan High School

Systematic theologians
Scottish scientists
Scottish Calvinist and Reformed theologians
Scottish chemists
Scottish scholars and academics
Group theorists
Alumni of the University of Edinburgh
1939 births
2012 deaths
Scientists from Glasgow